Legesse is a male given name of Ethiopian origin. Notable people with the name include:

Legesse Wolde-Yohannes, Ethiopian horticultural scientist
Meskerem Legesse (1986–2013), Ethiopian female middle-distance runner at the 2004 Olympics
Meskerem Assefa Legesse (born 1985), Ethiopian female middle-distance runner at the 2008 Olympics

Ethiopian given names
Amharic-language names